Bible John is an unidentified serial killer who is believed to have murdered three young women between 1968 and 1969 in Glasgow, Scotland.

Bible John's victims were all young brunette women between the ages of 25 and 32, all of whom had met their murderer at the Barrowland Ballroom, a dance hall and music venue in the city. The perpetrator has never been identified and the case remains both unsolved and one of the most extensive manhunts in Scottish criminal history. The case would prove to be the first time in Scotland in which the Crown Office authorised publication of a composite drawing of an individual suspected of murder.

This unidentified serial killer became known as "Bible John" due to his having repeatedly quoted from the Bible and to have condemned any form of adultery while in the company of his final victim. The known movements and modus operandi of convicted serial killer and rapist Peter Tobin gave rise to speculation that he might be Bible John, after his conviction for three murders in the late 2000s, but police later eliminated Tobin as a suspect.

First murders

Patricia Docker
On 23 February 1968, the naked body of 25-year-old auxiliary nurse Patricia Docker was found in the doorway of a lock-up garage by a man on his way to work at Carmichael Place, Battlefield, Glasgow. The location of her body was only yards from her home in Langside Place. Her body bore evidence of extensive blunt force trauma, particularly to the face and head. She had been strangled to death with a strong ligature, possibly a belt. Docker's handbag, watch, and clothes were missing from the crime scene. Her clothing was never found, although her handbag was later recovered from the River Cart by an underwater search unit, and her watch was recovered from a pool of water close to the murder scene.
 
Extensive door-to-door inquiries in the area produced a witness who recalled hearing a female scream, "Leave me alone!" the previous evening. Little hard evidence was discovered at the crime scene. Nonetheless, an ambulanceman who retrieved the body informed investigators the victim had been a nurse who worked at Mearnskirk Hospital in nearby Renfrewshire. Consequently, the victim was formally identified by her father the following day.

Docker was a married mother of one, estranged from her husband. The night of her murder, she informed her parents she would spend the evening dancing at the Majestic Ballroom on Hope Street, although for unknown reasons, she had chosen to spend the majority of the evening at the Barrowland Ballroom, probably because of the over-25s night which the venue hosted each Thursday. When she failed to return home that evening, her parents assumed she had spent the night with a friend. Police inquiries would only determine several days later that in the late evening, Docker had left the Majestic Ballroom to attend the Barrowland.

A postmortem conducted by Gilbert Forbes at the University of Glasgow Medical School confirmed that the cause of death had been strangulation, and that Docker's body bore no clear evidence of sexual assault. Furthermore, the stage of rigor mortis upon her body at the time of discovery indicated she had likely died shortly after she had left the Barrowland Ballroom. Investigators surmised the perpetrator had likely grabbed Docker before repeatedly punching her and kicking her in the face as she twice screamed, "Leave me alone!" He had then proceeded to rape Docker before strangling her to death, and leaving her naked body, with nothing but one shoe nearby, close to the doorway of the lock-up garage at Carmichael Place.

Jemima MacDonald
On Saturday 16 August 1969, a 31-year-old mother of three named Jemima MacDonald also opted to spend the evening dancing at the Barrowland Ballroom. MacDonald was a regular attendee of the Barrowland and, according to family custom, her sister, Margaret O'Brien, took care of her three children in her absence. This individual had short, dark brown hair with fair streaks, likely spoke with a distinctive Glaswegian accent and occasionally inserted brief biblical quotations into his conversation.

MacDonald was seen leaving the Barrowland shortly after midnight on 17 August in the company of this individual and was last seen walking towards either Main Street or Landressy Street, in the direction of her home, at approximately 12:40 a.m. O'Brien became concerned when her sister failed to return home. Later the same day, she began hearing local rumours that young children had been seen leaving a derelict tenement building in MacKeith Street discussing a body in the premises. By the Monday morning, O'Brien was so concerned that she herself, fearing the worst, walked into the old building. There she discovered her own sister's extensively battered body lying face down, with her shoes and stockings lying beside her.

A postmortem concluded that MacDonald had been raped and extensively beaten, particularly about the face, before she had been strangled to death with one of her own stockings. Her murder had occurred approximately 30 hours before her body had been discovered. Unlike Docker, the body of MacDonald was fully clothed, although her underclothing had been torn, and, like Docker, she had been menstruating at the time of her death.

Police inquiries into MacDonald's movements on the night of her murder produced several eyewitnesses who were able to accurately describe the man with whom she had been in the company of at the Barrowland. Door-to-door inquiries on MacKeith Street also produced a woman who remembered hearing female screams on the evening of MacDonald's murder, although this individual could not recall the precise time. Consequently, police considered this information of little use to their inquiry.

Initial investigation
Although the City of Glasgow Police noted several striking similarities between the murders of Docker and MacDonald, including that both women had attended the Barrowland Ballroom on the evening of their murder, been beaten before being strangled to death with a ligature, were menstruating, and had their handbags taken from the crime scene, initially both murders were not considered to be the work of the same perpetrator.

Despite extensive public appeals, the investigation into the murder of Docker had quickly become a cold case. Police had little information, owing to both a lack of witnesses and hard evidence. The investigation had also been severely hindered by investigators not discovering until three days after her death that Docker had attended the Barrowland on the evening of her murder. Eighteen months later, following the discovery of MacDonald, police became aware of remarkable similarities to the murder of Docker. Although police did not conclusively link both murders to the same perpetrator, they could not completely discount this theory. In addition, police were certain the perpetrator(s) held a high degree of local geographical knowledge. However, they may have been a stranger to the district, as none of the eyewitnesses with whom investigators conversed directly knew the man or men seen in the company of either woman prior to her murder.

For the first time in a Scottish murder hunt, a composite drawing of the man with whom MacDonald had last been seen alive was given to the press, being widely distributed via both newspapers and upon television throughout Scotland in efforts to identify the suspect. Moreover, both male and female undercover police officers performed discreet surveillance at the Barrowland Ballroom in efforts to identify the suspect. Police surveillance at the Barrowland Ballroom would be terminated in late October 1969 due to the initiative failing to produce any suspects. Detectives were also blamed by proprietors for a sharp decrease in attendance figures.

Helen Puttock
On 31 October 1969, a man walking his dog discovered the body of 29-year-old Helen Puttock behind a tenement in the Scotstoun district of Glasgow. Her body was found beside a drainpipe in the back garden of her Earl Street flat. She had been stripped partially naked, extensively beaten about the face before being raped, then strangled to death with one of her own stockings. The contents of her handbag had been scattered close to her body, although the handbag itself was missing from the crime scene. Grass and weed stains upon the soles of Puttock's feet and shoes indicated that she had engaged in a ferocious struggle with her killer. She had evidently at one point attempted to scale a nearby railway embankment. Her body also bore a deep bite mark on her upper right thigh. As had been the case with the two previous victims, Helen had been menstruating at the time of her murder. Her murderer had placed her sanitary towel beneath her left arm.

The evening prior to the murder, Puttock and her sister, Jean Langford, had been to the Barrowland Ballroom, where both had become acquainted with two men, both named John. One of these individuals had said he worked as a slater and resided in Castlemilk, while the other individual had been a well-spoken man who did not disclose where he actually lived. After being in the company of these two individuals for more than an hour, all four left the Barrowland to head home. The man named John who had been Jean's dance partner walked to George Square to board a bus, while Langford, Puttock, and the man who had been Puttock's dance partner hailed a taxi. The trio set off from Glasgow Cross, making a 20-minute westward journey toward Langford's Knightswood home. During the trio's conversation in the cab, most of the crucial information pertaining to the killer's psychological profile became apparent. Upon arrival at her home, Langford exited the cab leaving Puttock and her dance partner still inside. The cab then continued towards Puttock's home in Scotstoun.

Langford later informed detectives that her sister's companion had been a teetotal individual who repeatedly quoted from the Old Testament stories of Moses during the time she and her sister had conversed with him in the taxi. He had also referred to the Barrowland as an "adulterous den of iniquity", and of his disapproval of married women visiting the premises as the quartet had retrieved their coats at the end of the evening. She had exited the taxi at Kelso Street, before seeing the vehicle turn towards Earl Street.

Suspect
This individual had given his name as either "John Templeton", "John Sempleson", or "John Emerson", and he had been a polite and well-spoken individual, having frequently quoted from the Old Testament during the trio's taxi ride home, while also indicating he was neither Catholic nor Protestant. Langford stated that it had become increasingly clear to her as the trio had ridden in the taxi that this man had considered her presence in the vehicle to be an inconvenience. At one point during the ride, he had explained to the women the reason he refrained from consuming alcohol was due to his being conditioned by a strict parental attitude, before adding: "I don't drink at Hogmanay; I pray." He had also alluded to his father's belief that dance halls were "dens of iniquity", with any married woman who frequented these premises being "adulterous" by nature.

Langford had informed detectives that the man accompanying Puttock had been a "slim, tall" individual who had been dressed in a well-cut brown Reid and Taylor brand suit and who smoked Embassy cigarettes; she also recalled his mentioning that he had been familiar with several drinking premises in the Yoker district of Glasgow, and that he had at one stage worked in a laboratory. She was able to describe the distinct facial features of this man, such as overlapping front teeth. However, bouncers at the Barrowland Ballroom dismissed much of this description, claiming that the man had been a short and well-spoken individual with black hair.

The last possible sighting of the suspect was made by both the driver and conductor on a night service bus, who noticed a young man matching the description given by Langford alighting a bus at the junction of Dumbarton Road and Gray Street at approximately 2:00 a.m. on 31 October. He was in a particularly disheveled state, with mud stains on his jacket and a livid red mark on his cheek just beneath one eye. Both witnesses also recalled his repeatedly tucking a short cuff of one sleeve into his jacket sleeve (a man's cufflink had been found alongside the body of Helen Puttock). This individual was last seen walking towards the public ferry to cross the River Clyde to the south side of the city.

Link to series
The murder of Helen Puttock held remarkable similarities to the two previous murders, further raising suspicions that all three murders had been committed by the same person. Each of the victims had been the mother of at least one child and had met her murderer at the Barrowland Ballroom. The handbag of each woman was missing. Each victim had been strangled to death and at least two of these women had been raped prior to their murders. In addition, each of the three women had been escorted home by her killer and murdered within yards of her doorstep, and all had been menstruating at the time of death. Each had had her sanitary towel or tampon placed upon, beneath, or near her body, leading to speculation that the women had been murdered for their refusal to engage in intercourse with their murderer excused by their periods.

Ongoing investigation
Within hours of the discovery of the body of Helen Puttock, an additional composite drawing of the suspect was created using the detailed description provided by her sister. Langford saw the earlier image created after the murder of Jemima MacDonald and believed it was an excellent likeness. Detective Superintendent Joe Beattie asked the public to closely study this composite drawing, should it resemble anyone they knew. Due to the suspect's hair being unfashionably short for the era, over 450 hairdressers in and around Glasgow were shown the updated drawing of the suspect, and all dentists in and around the city were asked to examine their records to determine whether they held records of a male patient with overlapping incisors and a missing tooth in the upper right jaw. Both lines of inquiry proved fruitless. The police also produced an artist's impression portrait, created by Lennox Patterson, Registrar of the Glasgow School of Art, based on the recollections of Puttock's sister. In June 1970, police employed the photofit system in an attempt to produce a better likeness of the suspect. This was the first instance this method of identifying a murder suspect was utilised in Scotland.

More than 100 detectives were assigned to work full-time on the case, and 50,000 witness statements would be taken in subsequent door-to-door inquiries. Ultimately, more than 5,000 potential suspects would be questioned in the first year of the inquiry alone, and Jean Langford would be required to attend over 300 identity parades, although she was adamant none of the individuals required to participate in these identity parades had been the individual with whom she had last seen her sister, and all would be cleared of any involvement. Fearing that the perpetrator would strike again, a team of 16 detectives was instructed to mingle with dancers at all dance halls in Glasgow. In particular, these detectives frequented the Barrowland on Thursday and Saturday nights at the over-25s events, where each victim was presumed to have met her murderer.

Despite the extensive manhunt, no further developments would arise and the investigation into the three murders gradually became cold, with many officers assigned to the case believing that the perpetrator had either died, been jailed for an unrelated offence, had been incarcerated at a mental hospital or that senior police officers had known his actual identity but had been unable to prove he had committed the murders. Others speculated that he may have simply moved away from the Glasgow district, or murdered whenever in the vicinity; this possibility prompted police to circulate multiple copies of the composite drawing at all British Army, Navy and Air Force bases in the United Kingdom, Europe, and the Middle and Far East; this potential line of inquiry failed to produce any significant leads.

Potential suspects

"John White"
One former detective chief inspector, Les Brown (then working with the Strathclyde Police), has supplied current investigators with details of the arrest of a suspect conducted in 1969 which he believes was of an extremely likely perpetrator, but which was dismissed simply because he did not have notably overlapping front teeth.

According to Brown, the man's arguing with a young woman in the Barrowland Ballroom immediately prior to his arrest had greatly raised investigators' concerns, yet this suspect was released from custody, despite the fact he had closely resembled the facial composite and had subsequently supplied police with a false name and address before revealing his true name and address in the Gorbals. Brown said that the simple fact that this particular suspect did not have notably overlapping front teeth – despite one police sergeant's acknowledgement of his being the best suspect yet – was sufficient for ordering his release.

Several years later, Brown spoke at length to a detective who had taken the same man to a hospital after arresting him outside the Barrowland Ballroom at the time of the murders. Although the suspect had needed several stitches in his head following an altercation, as soon as his handcuffs had been released, he escaped from the hospital. At the time of this incident, this individual had also falsely given his name to medical personnel as John White.

In addition to this basic circumstantial evidence, the "whole demeanour" of the man had led Les Brown and several of his colleagues to believe he may have been the perpetrator. However, after Brown wrote of his suspicions in his 2005 autobiography, the individual came forward and offered to provide a DNA sample in order to clear his name. This has led to his elimination as a suspect.

Anonymous Netherlands resident
In 1983, an unidentified man contacted Strathclyde Police. This individual claimed to conclusively know that his friend had been Bible John, adding that both he and his friend had been raised in the Cranhill district of Glasgow and both had frequented the Barrowland Ballroom in the 1960s. He had, he claimed, read an article in the Evening Times five years previously before suddenly realising his friend had been the perpetrator of the murders. The alleged suspect was traced living in the Netherlands, married to a Dutch woman. Nothing more was ever heard from the claimant or the reputed suspect.

Hannah Martin rapist
In the years after the Bible John killings, a number of women came forward to claim that they had been sexually assaulted after an evening at the Barrowland. One of these women, Hannah Martin, claimed that she had been assaulted and raped by Bible John and had subsequently given birth to his child at the Glasgow Royal Maternity Hospital in January 1970; a daughter she initially named Isobel.

In April 1969, Martin had gone to the Barrowland; she ended up leaving the dance hall in the company of a tall man with whom she then had sex. Martin then accepted his offer of a lift home. However, during the drive, the man's sexual demeanour became more aggressive, and Martin, drunk and terrified she may be attacked, vomited in the man's car. This individual then bundled her out of the car and drove off, leaving her standing on the pavement. One author, David Leslie, has claimed that Martin's daughter could be the one indubitable link to the identity of Bible John.

John Irvine McInnes
In 1996, Strathclyde Police exhumed the body of John Irvine McInnes from a graveyard in Stonehouse, South Lanarkshire. McInnes, who had served in the Scots Guards, had committed suicide in 1980 at the age of 41, by severing the brachial artery in his upper arm. He was the cousin of one of the original suspects in the Bible John investigation. A DNA sample was taken from McInnes's body for comparison with semen samples found on the stockings belonging to Helen Puttock and which had been used to strangle her.

The results of the testing conducted proved inconclusive, with then-Lord Advocate Lord Mackay stating insufficient evidence existed to link McInnes with the murder of Helen Puttock. The Crown officially cleared McInnes of any involvement in the Bible John murders in July 1996.

Peter Tobin
Several criminologists and investigators have speculated that convicted serial killer Peter Tobin may have been Bible John. Tobin was convicted, in May 2007, of the 2006 murder of Polish student Angelika Kluk, who had been raped, beaten and then stabbed to death; he had relocated from Shettleston, Glasgow, to England in August 1969 (before the final two murders committed by Bible John) after marrying his first wife, whom he had met at the Barrowland Ballroom in 1968. From August 1969 Tobin lived in Brighton for 20 years, and from the late 1980s he would alternately reside in either Scotland or the south of England.

The fact that Tobin attacked Kluk so ferociously, hid her body, and then absconded to London prior to his arrest (in addition to the methods of violence perpetrated on the two 1991 victims unearthed from his Margate home's garden) did not suggest the work of an amateur. However, one discrepancy is that Bible John displayed his victims' bodies in public places, whereas Tobin buried all his known victims.

Some contemporary visual similarities exist between Peter Tobin when aged in his 20s and the 1969 composite drawing of Bible John, although the composite drawing showed Bible John with red hair and contemporary pictures of Tobin show he did not have this hair colour. In addition, all three of Tobin's former wives have given accounts of being repeatedly imprisoned, throttled, beaten and raped at his hands, and each has stated he had been driven to extreme physical violence by the female menstrual cycle (a factor long suspected by investigators as being the perpetrator's actual motive behind the murders). In addition, Tobin is known to have been a staunch Roman Catholic with strong religious views, and the alias Bible John may have given to Jean Langford and Helen Puttock in 1969 is similar to one of the pseudonyms known to have been regularly used by Tobin: John Semple.

Criminologist David Wilson actively investigated Tobin's case for three years and strongly believes the available evidence supports his theory that Tobin is Bible John. He has stated that the moment he believed Tobin was Bible John occurred during Tobin's trial for the 1991 murder of 18-year-old Dinah McNicol, one of the women whose bodies had been found in his Margate garden. The circumstantial evidence which Wilson uses to support this theory includes striking similarities between trial testimony from an acquaintance of McNicol's who had been in her company on the evening of her abduction and the conversation with Bible John that Jean Langford claimed to have had on the evening of her sister's murder; among the important points of overlap are both men mentioning they did not drink at Hogmanay and having a cousin who had once scored a hole-in-one in a golf match. This information—alongside other circumstantial evidence—has led Professor Wilson to state: "I didn't set out to prove Tobin was Bible John, but I would stake my professional reputation on it."

Although DNA testing has been used to clear several suspects, detectives believe obtaining a forensic link between Peter Tobin and any of the murder victims linked to Bible John is unlikely, due to the deterioration of the physical samples, owing to poor storage.

Operation Anagram

As a result of a police investigation named Operation Anagram, which was initiated in 2006 to trace the movements of Tobin throughout the decades and to determine his potential culpability in any other crimes, a woman informed investigators she had been raped by Tobin after she had met him at the Barrowland Ballroom in 1968, shortly after the first of the murders known to have been committed by Bible John.

Elimination as a suspect

Tobin has since been eliminated as a suspect by police. Although often reported that Tobin moved from Glasgow to Brighton after the 1969 murders, he in fact relocated from Glasgow to Brighton with his fiancée, Margaret Mountney, before the second murder attributed to Bible John. Operation Anagram discovered that Tobin was in Brighton at the time of the final two Bible John murders. He had married his first wife in Brighton on 6 August 1969, 10 days before the 16 August murder of Jemima MacDonald, as recorded on their marriage certificate. Tobin's wife has also testified that the pair were still on their honeymoon in Brighton at the time of the murder of the second victim, and she insists he was with her at the time. Tobin was also in police custody regarding an unrelated crime when another of the killings occurred. He was also still living in Brighton at the time of the third murder, meaning he would have had to travel without his wife's knowledge to Glasgow and back from Brighton to have committed the murder of Helen Puttock.

Tobin's DNA was checked against the semen sample for Bible John as part of Operation Anagram. The results of this analysis conclusively proved the bodily fluid did not source from Tobin. The doubts surrounding the DNA evidence notwithstanding, the police also have a record of the bite mark that was found on Helen Puttock's body which they can cross-check with Tobin's dental records, as had been done with John McInnes when he was exhumed and subsequently eliminated as a suspect in 1996.

David Swindle, the senior investigating officer in charge of Operation Anagram, has stated that there is no evidence to link Tobin to the Bible John murders, and Operation Anagram eventually discounted the theory. Swindle had previously presided over the 2002 review of the Bible John murders, four years before the initial discoveries of Tobin's murders.

Although professor David Wilson's claimed in his 2010 book The Lost British Serial Killer that Bible John was Tobin, his co-writer for the book Paul Harrison later recanted on the claims they made in the book. In 2013 Harrison published a new book, instead claiming Bible John was a police officer.

Aftermath
No further murder victims killed in Scotland or elsewhere in the United Kingdom have ever been conclusively attributed to Bible John, and the manhunt for this murderer was one of the most extensive manhunts in Scottish criminal history. The murders of the three women remain unsolved, although the case remains open, with many investigators remaining certain that the perpetrator(s) of these crimes were highly likely to have been shielded by one or more individuals whom he had known.

No uniform consensus exists that the three killings were actually the work of the same person. It has been claimed that the gap of 18 months between the first two killings is unusual for a serial killer, and that the later two murders may have either been copycat killings, or the sole two committed by the same perpetrator. Criticism has also been levelled against the police for potentially hampering their own investigation by prematurely jumping to the conclusion that all three murders had been committed by the same person.

In 2004, police announced their intentions to genetically test a number of men in a further attempt to identify the perpetrator, with all individuals concerned being requested to submit blood samples. This endeavour followed the previous discovery of an 80% genetic match from the semen samples retrieved from the final crime scene attributed to Bible John with a DNA sample retrieved at the site of a minor crime committed two years earlier. The sample was enough of a match to lead officers to believe that the person who committed the offence was related to the killer.

The sole witness ever to have engaged in a lengthy conversation with Bible John, Jean Langford, died in September 2010 at the age of 74. Langford had given police the description used to form the second composite drawing created of the suspect, which continues to remain the most significant clue as to the perpetrator's physical appearance. Despite Professor Wilson's assertion that Peter Tobin may have been Bible John, when Jean Langford discussed her sister's murderer many decades later, she dismissed this theory, stating emphatically that Tobin had not been the man with whom she had shared a taxi on the night of her sister's murder.

Media

Books

Television 
 The BBC has broadcast a 30-minute documentary focusing upon the murders committed by Bible John. Presented by Hugh Cochrane, this episode was screened on 18 September 1970, and concluded with a direct quote from Jeremiah, Chapter 23, Verse 24, appealing to the perpetrator to hand himself in to the police: 'Can any hide himself in secret places, that I shall not see him? saith the Lord?
 STV has broadcast a 45-minute documentary focusing upon the murders committed by Bible John. This documentary, titled In Search of Bible John, was initially broadcast in 2011, and explores the possibility Peter Tobin may have been the perpetrator of the three murders.
 The case of Bible John featured in a December 2005 episode of Unsolved. Narrated by Alex Norton, the program primarily focuses on the death of the final victim, Helen Puttock, and includes interviews with Puttock's husband George.
 A two-part documentary by BBC Scotland focuses on the manhunt for Bible John. Titled The Hunt for Bible John, this episode was first broadcast by BBC Scotland in November 2021, and across the UK on BBC Two in January 2022. The programme featured contributions from George Puttock, writer Andrew O'Hagan, journalist Magnus Linklater and psychologist David Canter.

See also

 Capital punishment in the United Kingdom
 List of fugitives from justice who disappeared
 List of serial killers by number of victims
 List of serial killers in the United Kingdom
 Unsolved murders in the United Kingdom

Notes

References

Cited works and further reading

External links
 2000 BBC News account detailing contemporary developments pertaining to leads in the Bible John case
 Bible John at CrimeLibrary.com
 Bible John at historicmysteries.com
 Contemporary edition of The Glasgow Herald, focusing upon the discovery of the body of Helen Puttock (p. 1)
 The true story of Bible John and the Barrowland killings at Glasgowlive.co.uk 
 Trace-evidence.com article pertaining to the Bible John murders

1968 in Scotland
1968 murders in the United Kingdom
1969 in Scotland
1969 murders in the United Kingdom
1960s in Glasgow
20th-century Scottish criminals
History of Glasgow
Murder in Glasgow
Murder in Scotland
People associated with Glasgow
Scottish rapists
Scottish serial killers
Unidentified serial killers
Unsolved murders in Scotland